Eoophyla melanops is a moth in the family Crambidae. It was described by George Hampson in 1896. It is found in Sikkim, India.

References

Eoophyla
Moths described in 1896